Heroes is a series of short novels and plays intended for young boys, created with series editor Frank Cottrell Boyce. The series includes teaching resources and is designed to motivate reluctant readers.

The series comprises three novels and one play intended for use in Year 7, and three novels and one play intended for use in Year 8, as part of Key Stage 3 . Each novel and play is also accompanied by an "ActiveTeach" CD-ROM providing interactive learning opportunities linked to the source material. There is also a Teacher Guidebook, Improve Boys' Reading.

Books

For Year 7 teaching
Eg and Me (by David Grant)
Ghost Game (by Nigel Hinton)
i-ssassins (by Christopher Edge)

For Year 8 teaching
Blood Oath (by Chris Priestley)
Do Not Wake the Devil (by A&P Peters)
Monster Island (by Justin Richards)

Plays

For Year 7 teaching
The Death of Jude Hill (by Richard Conlon)

For Year 8 teaching
Chamber of Nothing (by Cathy Forde)

References

British children's books
Series of children's books
Novel series